Hansberry College Prep, formerly known as "Noble Auburn Gresham College Prep", is a public four-year charter high school located in the Auburn Gresham in Chicago, Illinois. It is a part of the Noble Network of Charter Schools. Hansberry College Prep opened in 2012 as Noble Auburn Gresham College Prep in recognition of the neighborhood in which the school resides. In July 2013, the campus changed its name to Hansberry College Prep in honor of Lorraine Hansberry. The school currently serves grades nine through twelve and graduated its first class in 2016.   In 2014, HCP was officially authorized as an IB World school.

References

External links
Noble Network of Charter Schools
TheCharterSCALE: Hansberry College Prep

Educational institutions established in 2012
Noble Network of Charter Schools
Public high schools in Chicago
2012 establishments in Illinois